This list of Antillian and Bermudan animals extinct in the Holocene features animals known to have become extinct in the last 12,000 years on the Antilles archipelago and Bermuda (collectively known as the West Indies) between North America and South America.

Many extinction dates are unknown due to a lack of relevant information.

Mammals

Undated

Prehistoric

Recent

Local

Birds

Undated

Prehistoric

Recent

Local

Reptiles

Amphibians

Insects

Arachnids

Molluscs

See also
Holocene extinction
Timeline of extinctions in the Holocene
Settlement of the Americas
European colonization of the Americas
List of extinct animals
Fossil primates of South America and the Caribbean
Pilosans of the Caribbean
Rodents of the Caribbean

References 

Antilles
Antilles
Antilles
Antilles
Antilles

†Antilles